The chemical industry in the United Kingdom is one of the UK's main manufacturing industries. At one time, the UK's chemical industry was a world leader. The industry has also been environmentally damaging, and includes radioactive nuclear industries.

History

Sir William Henry Perkin FRS discovered the first synthetic dye mauveine in 1856, produced from aniline, having tried to synthesise quinine at his home on Cable Street in east London. Perkin's work, alone, led the way to the British chemical industry.

21% of the UK's chemical industry is in North West England, notably around Runcorn and Widnes. The chemical industry is 6.8% of UK manufacturing; around 85% of the UK chemical industry is in England.

It employs 500,000, including 350,000 indirectly.

It accounts for around 20% of the UK's research and development.

Output
In 2015, the UK chemical industry exported £50bn of products. The industry employs about 30,000 in research and development.

Regulation
Regulation of the UK chemical industry is largely under the European Chemicals Agency (ECHA) and the Registration, Evaluation, Authorisation and Restriction of Chemicals legislation (REACH).

Chemical plants

Teesside and Cheshire are areas with an established chemical industry. Significant chemical plants in the UK include:

 Battery Works at Stallingborough in North East Lincolnshire, built by Taylor Woodrow Construction in 1950 for Laporte Industries
 Billingham Manufacturing Plant, former ICI plant that makes nitrate fertiliser
 Ineos Grangemouth chemicals plant, the propylene plant began in 1949, being opened at Grangemouth, Stirlingshire in May 1951 for British Petroleum Chemicals, which had been formed jointly between The Distillers Company and the Anglo-Iranian Oil Company (known as BP from 1954) in 1948. It would later have a crude oil feed from the Forties Oil Field
 INEOS Nitriles (former BASF before 2008) at Seal Sands is Europe's largest producer of acetonitrile; it was built by Monsanto in the early 1970s
 International Paint in Heworth, near Gateshead, east of Felling, make paint for corrosive environments
 North Tees Works, former ICI near Seal Sands, east of Billingham in Stockton. Announced in June 1964, to make cyclohexane and aromatics. Made 400,000 tonnes a year, to be the biggest aromatics plant in Europe, opened 1966, built by Procon By 1970, would be the biggest aromatics plant in the world, when expanded south of the Tees, with a pipeline connecting the two sites. ICI jointly operated two neighbouring oil refineries. Shell had a refinery at Teesport
 P&G London Plant, at West Thurrock; it makes Ariel, Bold, Fairy and Daz
 Seal Sands, run by Lennig Chemicals, the site was built in 1972, later owned by Rohm & Haas, for making acrylate monomer
 Stallingborough Plant, owned by Tronox (Millennium Chemicals until 2007, then Cristal Pigment until 2019); it has been running since 1953 when owned by Laporte
 William Blythe in Church, Lancashire near Accrington
 Wilton International, built by ICI; it is 4000 acres and an olefine site
 Winnington Works, owned by Tata Chemicals Europe previously ICI, at Anderton with Marbury in Cheshire on the River Weaver; it was built in 1874, sold by ICI in 1991; it makes sodium bicarbonate

Former chemical plants

 Baglan Bay Works, built similar to the Grangemouth plant for British Hydrocarbon Chemicals (from 1956) by George Wimpey, from 1961 between Port Talbot and Neath in south Wales, it had a light distillate feed from the nearby Llandarcy Oil Refinery, with a steam cracker. British Hydrocarbon Chemicals became BP Chemicals in 1967. It was demolished in 2003.
 Elementis chromium plant at Urlay Nook, near Eaglescliffe; it closed in June 2009
 Four Ashes Chemical Plant, Schenectady Europe (SI Group, former Laporte before 1999) off the A449 in Four Ashes, Staffordshire; it was demolished in 2007
 Grimsby Works, built for Courtaulds
 Hickson & Welch in Castleford; it suffered an explosion in 1992
 Rio Tinto Zinc smelter at Avonmouth, the National Smelting Company, where the Imperial Smelting Process was developed in the 1950s, in the 1960s it was the largest zinc blast furnace in the world
 Lennig Chemicals opened its Tyneside Works at Jarrow in 1960, which was bought by Rohm and Haas in the 1970s, and bought by Dow Chemicals in 2009, and closed in 2015
 Unilever Warrington made Persil and Surf; it closed on Thursday 15 October 2020, near Warrington Bank Quay railway station
 William Blythe chemical Works at Hapton, Lancashire, next to the M65, in the Borough of Burnley

Companies

Significant chemical companies in the UK have been:
 Fisons, a significant East of England fertiliser company, bought in 1995
 Ineos, it took over many production sites of ICI
 Unilever, with a main detergent site in Warrington and home care manufacture and research on the Wirral

Organisations
Relevant organisations related to the UK chemical industry are the Institution of Chemical Engineers (IChemE), the Chemical Industries Association, and the Society of Chemical Industry. The chemical industry in Europe is represented by the European Chemical Industry Council or CEFIC.

See also
 Energy in the United Kingdom
 Pharmaceutical industry in the United Kingdom

References

External links
 Chemical Industries Association (CIA)

 
Manufacturing in the United Kingdom